UMP may refer to:

Science
 Ultra metal-poor star, refers to a type of star with extremely low levels of heavier elements
 Uniformly most powerful test, in statistical hypothesis testing
 Uridine monophosphate, a nucleotide
 Utility maximization problem

Organisations
 Ulba Metallurgical Plant
 Ulyanovsk Mechanical Plant
 Union for a Popular Movement or UMP, as of 2015 the former name of the main right-wing political party in France
 Union of Moderate Parties or UMP, the main Vanuatuan francophone and conservative party
 United Midwestern Promoters, a racing sanctioning body
 Universiti Malaysia Pahang, a university in Malaysia

Places
 Indianapolis Metropolitan Airport (by FAA code)
 Uzumba-Maramba-Pfungwe, Zimbabwe

Other
 Heckler & Koch UMP, a submachine gun
 Umpila language, by ISO 639 code
 Universal mapping property

See also
ump, slang term for "umpire"
WUMP, a sports radio station in Huntsville, Alabama, known as SportsRadio 730 The UMP